The Bell FCX-001 is an American conceptual helicopter design proposed by Bell Helicopter. It was first presented to the public at Heli-Expo 2017 in Dallas on March 7, 2017.

Design and development
On March 7, 2017, Bell Helicopter presented a conceptual, futuristic looking aircraft. The mock-up presented is configured for eight passengers, but will be capable of accommodating up to 12. On top of the aircraft are five "morphing" main rotor blades which aim to allow the tip of each blade to move between different flight regimes. This feature is supposed to maximize efficiency and performance and reduce noise. The airframe is slightly bigger than that of a Bell 412.

References

External links

 Bell FCX-001 page
 Bell’s FCX-001 Concept Helicopter Showcases Future Technology – AINtv
 Look Inside the Sleekest Helicopter That Will Never Fly – Bloomberg

Compound helicopters
Proposed aircraft of the United States
FCX-001